The Mrs. Korea Pageant, often referred to as Mrs. Korea World, is a beauty and career competition that was established to honor married women throughout South Korea. The current titleholder is Hera Han of Seoul.

Titleholders
Titleholders are designated by year of reign.

References

External links

Beauty pageants in South Korea
South Korean popular culture
South Korean awards
Annual events in South Korea